Herington is a city in Dickinson and Morris counties in the U.S. state of Kansas.  As of the 2020 census, the population of the city was 2,109.

History

19th century
Herington was named after its founder, Monroe Davis Herington.  His name at birth was Davis Monroe Herrington, but he later dropped the second "r" from his last name.

The first post office in Herington was established in February 1884.

In 1887, Mr. Herington successfully got the Chicago, Kansas and Nebraska Railway to build through Herington. He gave the land and right-of-way for Herington to become a division point with shops, two round houses, freight house, bridge yards, telegraph office and many other buildings. That same year, the Chicago, Kansas and Nebraska Railway built a main line from Topeka to Herington. Also in 1887, the Chicago, Kansas and Nebraska Railway extended its main line from Herington to Pratt. This line is called the "Golden State Limited". That same year,  the Chicago, Kansas and Nebraska Railway built a branch line north-south from Herington to Caldwell. By 1893, this branch line was incrementally built to Fort Worth, Texas. This line is called the "OKT".

The Chicago, Kansas and Nebraska Railway was foreclosed in 1891 and was taken over by Chicago, Rock Island and Pacific Railway, which shut down in 1980 and reorganized as Oklahoma, Kansas and Texas Railroad, merged in 1988 with Missouri Pacific Railroad, merged in 1997 with Union Pacific Railroad.  Most locals still refer to this railroad as the "Rock Island".

20th century
The National Old Trails Road, also known as the Ocean-to-Ocean Highway, was established in 1912, and was routed through Herington, Delavan, and Council Grove. The American Discovery Trail passes through Herington.

In World War II, Herington Army Airfield was built and was one of only two fields that processed heavy bombardment crews and equipment staging to the coasts for overseas duty. The field was later turned over to the City of Herington and is currently used as a municipal airport.

Geography

Cityscape
Local attractions include:
 Herington Historical Museum.
In 2012, the Eisenhower marker replaced the previous "Father Juan De Padilla And Quivira" marker.

Demographics

2010 census
As of the census of 2010, there were 2,526 people, 1,082 households, and 666 families living in the city. The racial makeup of the city was 93.3% White, 0.4% African American, 0.9% Native American, 0.5% Asian, 0.2% Pacific Islander, 1.7% from other races, and 2.9% from two or more races. Hispanic or Latino of any race were 5.7% of the population.

There were 1,082 households, of which 32.3% had children under the age of 18 living with them, 44.0% were married couples living together, 12.4% had a female householder with no husband present, 5.2% had a male householder with no wife present, and 38.4% were non-families. 33.5% of all households were made up of individuals, and 16.8% had someone living alone who was 65 years of age or older. The average household size was 2.29 and the average family size was 2.89.

The median age in the city was 39.2 years. 25.1% of residents were under the age of 18; 7.8% were between the ages of 18 and 24; 22.8% were from 25 to 44; 24.4% were from 45 to 64; and 19.9% were 65 years of age or older. The gender makeup of the city was 47.8% male and 52.2% female.

2000 census
As of the census of 2000, there were 2,563 people, 1,126 households, and 669 families living in the city.
 
The racial makeup of the city was 95.8% White, 0.6% African American, 0.4% Native American, 0.5% Asian, <0.1% Pacific Islander, 1.6% from other races, and 1.0% from two or more races. Hispanic or Latino of any race were 4.5% of the population.

There were 1,126 households, out of which 26.6% had children under the age of 18 living with them, 47.2% were married couples living together, 8.9% had a female householder with no husband present, and 40.5% were non-families. 36.9% of all households were made up of individuals, and 19.9% had someone living alone who was 65 years of age or older. The average household size was 2.21 and the average family size was 2.88.

In the city, the population was spread out, with 24.0% under the age of 18, 7.0% from 18 to 24, 25.0% from 25 to 44, 20.1% from 45 to 64, and 24.0% who were 65 years of age or older. The median age was 41 years. For every 100 females, there were 88.7 males. For every 100 females age 18 and over, there were 83.7 males.

The median income for a household in the city was $28,333, and the median income for a family was $36,696. Males had a median income of $28,359 versus $15,515 for females. The per capita income for the city was $16,526. About 6.2% of families and 8.2% of the population were below the poverty line, including 10.0% of those under age 18 and 7.6% of those age 65 or over.

Government
The Herington government is a Commissioner-Manager form of government. The commission appoints a mayor every year to represent the City in a ceremonial role. The commissioner elections are at-large.

Education

Primary and secondary education
The community is served by Herington USD 487 public school district. The high school is a member of T.E.E.N., a shared video teaching network between five area high schools.

Schools in Herington include:
 Herington High School.
 Herington Middle School.
 Herington Elementary School.
 Herington Little Railer Preschool.

Library
The Herington Public Library is a Carnegie library.

Infrastructure

Transportation

Rail
From its beginnings, Herington has been a hub for the Rock Island, the Cotton Belt Route, Southern Pacific, and currently Union Pacific Railroad.  UP still uses this as its hub on its system to this day.  Herington has also been served by the Rio Grande, Missouri Pacific, and the Oklahoma, Kansas and Texas Railroad.

Air
Airports include:
 Herington Regional Airport, FAA:HRU.
 ICAO:KHRU, located east of Herington.

Notable people
See List of people from Dickinson County, Kansas
 Bruce P. Blake - Bishop of the United Methodist Church
 Brad Crandall - radio personality
 Louis Durant - racecar driver
 John Eastwood - World War II US Army Air Forces chaplain 
 Emil Kapaun - Roman Catholic priest and Medal Of Honor recipient United States Army chaplain
 Terry Nichols - accomplice in the 1995 Oklahoma City bombing of the Alfred P. Murrah Federal Building
 Calvin Wright - Idaho politician
 Alan Shields - American artist

See also
 National Old Trails Road

References

Further reading

External links

 
 Herington - Directory of Public Officials
 Historic Images of Herington, Special Photo Collections at Wichita State University Library
 Herington city map, KDOT

Cities in Kansas
Cities in Dickinson County, Kansas
Cities in Morris County, Kansas